Brian X. Foley (born December 3, 1957) is an American politician who served as a member of the New York State Senate in 2009 and 2010. He previously served as a member of the Suffolk County Legislature.

Early life and education 
A graduate of St. Anthony's High School, Foley continued his education at Saint Michael's College in Colchester, Vermont, where he earned a Bachelor of Arts degree in American studies.

Career 
He was re-elected five times to the seat once held by his father, John Foley. In 2005, he was elected supervisor of Brookhaven, New York. In 2008, he was elected to the State Senate, after defeating 36-year (18 term) incumbent Republican, Caesar Trunzo. He was the first Democrat elected to the State Senate from Suffolk County since 1902.

He has served on the Brookhaven Roe YMCA Board of Directors, Brookhaven Memorial Hospital Advisory Board, Patchogue Chamber of Commerce, Suffolk County Community Mediation Center, Sunrise District Boy Scouts of America and the Suffolk County Coalition Against Domestic Violence. In 2004, the Bayport Blue Point Chamber of Commerce presented Foley with its Dedicated Public Service Award. He has been recognized as Person of the Year by the Medford Youth Athletic Association Award in 2000 and the Farmingville Historical Society in 1999.

Marriage Equality Debate 2009
Brian X. Foley was seen as a key swing senate vote in the 2009 Marriage Equality debate in New York State. In April 2009, Governor
David Paterson announced that he would introduce a Marriage Equality bill in the New York State Legislature. Foley voted in favor of Marriage Equality legislation on December 2, 2009, but the bill was defeated.

MTA bailout proposal
Foley supported an MTA bailout that included a controversial payroll tax on employers. Foley, had balked at the payroll tax because it affected school districts and would likely raise property taxes. In 2009, Foley pledged his support for the MTA bailout.

2010 defeat
Foley was defeated by Republican Lee Zeldin on November 2, 2010. Senator-Elect Zeldin received 57% of votes cast, defeating Foley by 14 points.

Personal life 
Foley resides in Blue Point, New York with his wife and their two children.

See also
 2009 New York State Senate leadership crisis

References

1957 births
Living people
People from Blue Point, New York
Democratic Party New York (state) state senators
21st-century American politicians
Catholics from New York (state)